USS Chief has been the name of three ships in the United States Navy.

 , was renamed Bold on 23 May 1941.
 , is an  commissioned on 5 November 1994.

United States Navy ship names